The Uwa language, Uw Cuwa, commonly known as Tunebo, is a Chibchan language spoken by between 1,800 and 3,600 of the Uwa people of Colombia, out of a total population of about 7,000.

Varieties
There are half a dozen known varieties. Communication between modern varieties can be difficult, so they are considered distinct languages.

Adelaar (2004) lists the living 
central dialects Cobaría and Tegría on the northern slopes of the Sierra Nevada del Cocuy, 
a western group near Agua Blanca in the departments of Santander and Norte de Santander, 
an eastern group at a place called Barro Negro in the lowlands of Arauca and Casanare, 
and the extinct dialect Sínsiga near Chita, Boyacá.

Umaña (2012) lists Cobaría, Tegría, Agua Blanca, Barro Negro.

Berich lists the dialects Cobaría; Agua Blanca (= Uncasía, Tamarana, Sta Marta); Rinconada, Tegría, Bócota, & Báchira

Cassani lists Sínsiga, Tegría, Unkasía (= Margua), Pedraza, Manare, Dobokubí (= Motilón)

Osborn (1989) lists 
Bethuwa (= Pedraza, extinct), 
Rikuwa (Dukarúa, = Agua Blanca), 
Tagrinuwa (Tegría), 
Kubaruwa (Cobaría), 
Kaibaká (= Bókota), 
Yithkaya (= San Miguel / Barro Negro), 
Bahiyakuwa (= Sínsiga), 
Biribirá, 
and Ruba, 
the latter all extinct

Fabre (2005) lists:
Bontoca (perhaps the same as the Bókota = Kaibaká cited in Osborn), of the mountains of Guican
Cobaría, along the Cobaría River
Pedraza or Bethuwa [= Angosturas?], along the Venezuelan border; extinct
Sínsiga, in the Guican mountains, recorded from Chita, Boyaca in 1871
Tegría or Tagrinuwa, along the Cobaría River
Unkasia, along the Chitiga and Marga rivers (Telban 1988)

Additional names in Loukotka are Manare and Uncasica (presumably a spelling variant of Unkasía/Uncacía), as well as Morcote, of which nothing is known. Manare, at the source of the Casanare, is Eastern Tunebo.

Phonology

Vowel

Consonants

Notes

References

Alain Fabre, 2005. Diccionario etnolingüístico y guía bibliográfica de los pueblos indígenas sudamericanos.
Edna R. Headland, 1994. Diccionario Bilingüe Tunebo-Español, Español-Tunebo con una breve gramática tuneba. Ann Arbor: UMI.

External links
uwacolombia.org

Chibchan languages
Languages of Colombia
Languages of Venezuela